Charles Carr may refer to:

Sports
Charlie Carr (1876–1932), American baseball first baseman
Charles Carr (cricketer) (1849–1921), Australian cricketer
Charlie Carr (rugby league), English rugby league footballer

Others
Charles Carr, 2nd Earl of Ancram (1624–1690), British peer
Charles Hardy Carr (1903–1976),  United States federal judge
Charles L. Carr Jr., National Commander of Civil Air Patrol
Charlie Carr (activist) (born 1953), American disability rights activist
Charles Carr (bishop of Killaloe) (1682–1739), Irish Anglican clergyman
Charles Lisle Carr (1871–1942), Church of England bishop

See also 
Chuck Carr (disambiguation)
Charles Kerr (disambiguation), variant spelling 
Charles Ker (disambiguation), variant spelling